Marion Hänsel (née Ackermann; 12 February 1949 – 8 June 2020) was a French-born Belgian film director, producer, actress and screenwriter. Her film Between the Devil and the Deep Blue Sea was entered into the 1995 Cannes Film Festival.

Hänsel was posthumously awarded an Honorary Magritte Award at the 11th Magritte Awards.

Selected filmography
 Palaver (1969)
 Le Lit (1982)
 Dust (1985)
 The Cruel Embrace (1987)
  (1990)
 Between Heaven and Earth (1992)
 Between the Devil and the Deep Blue Sea (1995)
 The Quarry (1998)
 Hell (2005)
 Sounds of Sand (2006)
 Noir océan (2010)
 La Tendresse (2013)
 En amont du fleuve (2016)

References

External links

1949 births
2020 deaths
Belgian film directors
Belgian film producers
Belgian film actresses
Belgian screenwriters
Belgian women film directors
French emigrants to Belgium
Magritte Award winners
Mass media people from Marseille
Belgian women screenwriters